Cochleosauridae is a family of edopoid temnospondyl amphibians, among the most basal of temnospondyls. Most members of this family are known from the late Carboniferous (Pennsylvanian) and early Permian (Cisuralian) of Europe and North America, though Nigerpeton is known from the Late Permian (Lopingian) of Niger in North Africa.

Gallery

External links
Cochleosauridae at The Paleobiology Database.

 
Edopoids
Prehistoric amphibian families